WAJQ-FM (104.3 FM) is a radio station broadcasting a classic country format licensed to Alma, Georgia, United States.  The station is currently owned by Blueberry Broadcasting Company, Inc.

History
The station went on the air as WULF-FM on December 11, 1984. On May 5, 1987, the station changed its call sign to WKXH-FM, changing again on November 4, 1994, to the current WAJQ.

References

External links

AJQ-FM
Radio stations established in 1984